Bruce L. Edwards (September 5, 1952 – October 28, 2015) was an American Professor Emeritus of English and Africana Studies and in the past served as Associate Vice President for Online Programs and E-learning Services at Bowling Green State University in Bowling Green, Ohio, United States, where he was a faculty member and administrator between 1981-2012.

Biography
Edwards was born in Akron, Ohio, attending the Akron City Public Schools. He received an A.A. in Biblical Studies at Florida College, and then graduated with a B.A. in English from the University of Missouri–Rolla in 1977, and received his master's degree in English from Kansas State University in 1979. He earned his Ph.D. in Literature and Rhetoric from the University of Texas at Austin in 1981, writing his dissertation on the literary criticism of C. S. Lewis.

In the past, he served as Fulbright Fellow in Nairobi, Kenya (1999-2000), teaching at Daystar University, and as a Bradley Research Fellow at the Heritage Foundation in Washington, DC (1989–90), and as the S. W. Brooks Memorial Professor of Literature at The University of Queensland, Brisbane, Australia (1988).

Edwards attended Florida College in the early 1970s and preached for several churches in Kentucky, Kansas, and elsewhere in the 1970s-80s. He later earned a PhD in English and became a well-recognized CS Lewis scholar, spending his academic teaching career at Bowling Green State University in Ohio before retiring to Alaska.

C. S. Lewis focus
He served as general editor for the 2007 four volume reference set, C. S. Lewis: Life, Works, and Legacy (Praeger Perspectives, 2007). This set is a comprehensive treatment of Lewis's life and times with more than 40 worldwide contributors. His books on The Chronicles of Narnia: Not a Tame Lion (Tyndale, 2005) and Further Up and Further In: Understanding C. S. Lewis’s The Lion, the Witch and the Wardrobe, were well received, and he published two previous books on Lewis, including A Rhetoric of Reading: C. S. Lewis’s Defense of Western Literacy, and The Taste of the Pineapple: Essays on C. S. Lewis as Reader, Critic, and Imaginative Writer; and he was also a contributor to many collections of essays about Lewis and the Inklings, and for many years maintained a web site on the life and works of C. S. Lewis (https://web.archive.org/web/20180809163406/http://cslewisreview.org/). Edwards also published several successful textbooks for college audiences, including, Roughdrafts (Houghton-Mifflin, 1987), Processing Words (Prentice-Hall, 1988), and Searching for Great Ideas (1st and 2nd editions; Harcourt, 1989; 1992).

Edwards was the recipient of a 1990-2000 Fulbright Program Fellowship to Kenya, as well as a 2005 Fulbright-Hays Grant that allowed him to take a contingent of public and private educators to Tanzania for six weeks in the summer of 2005 to establish internet-based educational opportunities for both Midwestern U.S. and Tanzanian students.

Personal life and death
Edwards and his wife, Joan, lived in Willow, Alaska, following his 2012 retirement. They had four children. He died on October 28, 2015 from a ruptured aortic aneurysm while on a trip to Texas.

References

External links
Bruce L. Edwards Web Page
C. S. Lewis Review Web Page

1952 births
2015 deaths
American academics of English literature
Bowling Green State University faculty
The Heritage Foundation
People from Akron, Ohio
Missouri University of Science and Technology alumni
People from Bowling Green, Ohio
Journalists from Ohio
Fulbright alumni